William Joseph O'Neil Daunt (28 April 1807 – 29 June 1894) was an Irish politician and author.

Born in Tullamore, Daunt grew up on the small estate of Kilkascan, near Ballineen.  There, he came to know Feargus O'Connor, who lived nearby.  Although he was brought up as a Protestant, after his father's death, Daunt joined the Catholic church.  He also became active in local politics as an opponent of tithes payable to the Church of Ireland, and a supporter of Daniel O'Connell.

Daunt stood at the 1832 UK general election in Mallow, for the Repeal Association.  His opponent was the incumbent, Denham Jephson, who owned almost every house in the town and was considered the overwhelming favourite.  However, Jephson did not support repealing the union of Great Britain and Ireland, and this turned opinion against him, with Daunt winning a surprise victory, described by The Times as "perhaps the most extraordinary of all the extraordinary instances of Daniel O'Connell's influence" at the election.  However, an election petition overturned the result, and Jephson was seated in Daunt's place.  Daunt lost a large sum of money as a result of the episode.

In 1841, O'Connell was elected as Lord Mayor of Dublin, and he appointed Daunt as his secretary.  Daunt then became one of 15 founders of the Loyal National Repeal Association, becoming its director in Leinster and then in Scotland.  From 1864, he was prominent in the National Association of Ireland, and he focused on building links with the Liberal Party in England.  He played a leading role in founding the Home Government Association, and served as its secretary in 1873.

Outside politics, Daunt wrote history books, and under the pseudonym Denis Ignatius Moriarty, also wrote novels.  He also kept a diary, which was published after his death as A life spent for Ireland.

References

1807 births
1894 deaths
Irish historians
Irish Repeal Association MPs
Members of the Parliament of the United Kingdom for County Cork constituencies (1801–1922)
UK MPs 1832–1835